Sîn-māgir (Dsuen-ma-gir), inscribed  dEN.ZU-ma-gir, “Sîn upholds,” c. 1763 – 1753 BC (short chronology) or c. 1827 – 1817 BC (middle chronology) was the 14th king of Isin and he reigned for 11 years.

Biography

His reign falls over the last six years of Warad-Sin and the first five of Rim-Sin I, the sons of Kudur-Mabuk and successive kings of Larsa, and wholly within the reign of the Babylonian monarch Apil-Sin. There are currently six extant royal inscriptions, including brick palace inscriptions, seals for his devoted servants, such as Iddin-damu, his “chief builder,” and Imgur-Sîn, his administrator, and a cone which  records the construction of a storehouse for the goddess Aktuppītum of Kiritab in his honor commissioned by Nupṭuptum, the lukur priestess or concubine, “his beloved traveling escort, mother of his first-born.”

An inscription marks the construction of a defensive wall, called Dūr-Sîn-māgir, “Sîn-māgir makes the foundation of his land firm,” at Dunnum, a city northeast of Nippur. Control of Nippur itself however may have shifted to Larsa, under the rule of Warad-Sîn and his father, Kudur-Mabuk, the power behind the throne, as his sixth year-name celebrates that he “had (14 copper statues brought into Nippur and) 3 thrones adorned with gold brought into the temples of Nanna, Ningal and Utu.” Larsa was to retain Nippur until year nine of Rīm-Sîn when it was lost to Damiq-ilišu. One of the cones bearing this inscription was found in the ruins of the temple of Ninurta, the é-ḫur-sag-tí-la, in Babylon, and is thought likely to have been an ancient museum piece. The city of Dunnum, the celebration of whose original foundation may have been the purpose of the Dynasty of Dunnum myth, was taken by Rim-Sin the year before he conquered Isin and so it is conjectured that the cone was taken from Larsa as booty by Ḫammu-rapī.

Two legal tablets offered for private sale, recording sales of a storehouse and palm grove, give a year-name elsewhere unattested, “year Sîn-māgir the king dug the Ninkarrak canal.” Another year-name marks 
"(Sîn-māgir) built on the bank of the Iturungal canal (the old wadi) a great fortification (called) Sîn-māgir-madana-dagal-dagal (Sîn-māgir broadens his country)." A province in the south and a town in eastern Babylonia near Tuplias are both called Bīt-Sîn-māgir and some historians have speculated one or other were named in his honor.

External links
Sîn-māgir Year names at CDLI

Inscriptions

References

 

19th-century BC Sumerian kings
18th-century BC Sumerian kings
Dynasty of Isin